Elkhart–Morton County Airport  is a county-owned public-use airport located one nautical mile (1.85 km) east of the central business district of Elkhart, a city in Morton County, Kansas, United States.

Although most U.S. airports use the same three-letter location identifier for the FAA and IATA, this airport is assigned EHA by the FAA but has no designation from the IATA.

Facilities and aircraft 
It has two asphalt paved runways designated 4/22 and 17/35, each of which measure 4,900 by 60 feet (1,494 x 18 m).

For the 12-month period ending August 22, 2007, the airport had 6,000 general aviation aircraft operations, an average of 16 per day. At that time there were 12 aircraft based at this airport:
92% single-engine and 8% multi-engine.

References

External links 
 Aerial photo as of 3 April 2003 from USGS The National Map
 

Airports in Kansas
Buildings and structures in Morton County, Kansas